Caminus is a genus of sea sponges belonging to the family Geodiidae.

Species 
 Caminus albus Pulitzer-Finali, 1996
 Caminus awashimensis Tanita, 1969
 Caminus carmabi Van Soest, Meesters & Becking, 2014
 Caminus chinensis Lindgren, 1897
 Caminus jejuensis Shim & Sim, 2012
 Caminus primus Sim-Smith & Kelly, 2015
 Caminus sphaeroconia Sollas, 1886
 Caminus strongyla (Hoshino, 1981)
 Caminus vulcani Schmidt, 1862

References

Tetractinellida
Sponge genera